The North Staffordshire Royal Infirmary was a hospital at Hartshill in the English county of Staffordshire. It was located half a mile east of the site of the Royal Stoke University Hospital. It was run by the University Hospitals of North Midlands NHS Trust.

History
The original hospital in the area was established at Etruria in 1804 but was completely rebuilt on a much larger basis in 1814. The hospital then relocated to Hartshill as the North Staffordshire Royal Infirmary in 1869. It became the North Staffordshire Infirmary and Eye Hospital in 1890 and the North Staffordshire Royal Infirmary in 1925.

The facility joined the National Health Service in 1948 and, after services were transferred to the Royal Stoke University Hospital, it closed in December 2012. The site is still used by the University Hospitals of North Midlands NHS Trust for car parking and offices.

References

Defunct hospitals in England
Hospital buildings completed in 1869
Hospitals in Staffordshire